The Battle of Buenavista was a battle of the Tacna and Arica campaign of the War of the Pacific on April 18, 1880, between a Chilean cavalry detachment led by Commander José Francisco Vergara, and the forces of Colonel Gregorio Albarracín in the , Tacna Province, Peru.

Background
On April 1, 1880, the Battle of Locumba took place, in which a Chilean cavalry detachment led by Dublé Almeyda was unexpectedly attacked by Gregorio Albarracín. Dublé Almeyda and three soldiers managed to mount and escape towards Moquegua, leaving eight Chileans dead and the rest prisoners, who were sent to Tacna and then La Paz.

Due to the disaster at Locumba, Dublé was tried in a court-martial before being acquitted. This motivated the mobilization of a Chilean column, of about 600 soldiers under the command of Commander José Francisco Vergara, with the aim of confronting Albarracín, who was arming the populations of the interior against the Chileans.

On April 10, the Chileans went looking for Gregorio Albarracín, but didn't find him at Locumba.

Albarracin withdrew towards Mirave, some 30 kilometers into the valley, and from there headed south towards the Rio Sama Valley .

The Battle
Albarracín gathered the residents of Sama to confront Vergara, and on April 18, 1880, the Battle of Buenavista took place, in the same valley of the Sama River. Albarracín attacked a Chilean outpost led by Ensign Souper, who withdrew from the valley, to return with 450 men under the command of Tomás Yávar. Then Albarracín withdrew to Tacna, leaving the sameños in the valley, those who, without weapons, were decimated in the grasslands of Sama. The battle caused the loss of 100 men, and 35 prisoners. Albarracín managed to withdraw to Tacna with only 30 men.

Just 3 kilometers south of Buenavista, the Chilean army would be concentrated a few weeks later, in the so-called Las Yaras camp, prior to the Battle of Tacna.

References

 Gonzalo Bulnes (1914). Guerra del Pacífico. De Tarapacá a Lima. Valparaíso, Chile: Sociedad Imprenta y Litografía Universo, p. 239.
 Pascual Ahumada Moreno (1886).  [War of the Pacific, complete compilation of all the official documents, correspondence and other publications referring to the war that have come to light in the press of Chile, Peru and Bolivia, containing important unpublished documents.] Chapter II. Valparaíso, Chile: 
 Academia de Historia Militar (1980). Historia del Ejército de Chile. Chapter 5. El ejército en la guerra del Pacífico. Ocupación de Antofagasta y Campaña de Tarapacá.

Battles involving Chile
Battles involving Peru
Battles of the War of the Pacific
History of Tacna Region
Conflicts in 1880
1880 in Peru
April 1880 events